Timbira is a dialect continuum of the Northern Jê language group of the Jê languages ̣(Macro-Jê) spoken in Brazil. The various dialects are distinct enough to sometimes be considered separate languages. The principal varieties, Krahô  (Craó), and Canela  (Kanela), have 2000 speakers apiece, few of whom speak Portuguese. Pará Gavião has 600–700 speakers. Krẽje, however, is nearly extinct, with only 30 speakers in 1995.

Timibira has been intensive contact with various Tupi-Guarani languages of the lower Tocantins-Mearim area, such as Guajajára, Tembé, Guajá, and Urubú-Ka'apór. Ararandewára, Turiwára, Tupinamba, and Nheengatu have also been spoken in the area. Some of people in the area are also remembers of Anambé and Amanajé.

Varieties
Linguistic varieties of Timbira include:

Canela (subdivided into Apànjêkra and Mẽmõrtũmre (a.k.a. Ràmkôkãmẽkra)), 2,500 speakers in Maranhão
Krahô, 2,000 speakers in Tocantins
Krĩkatí, spoken in Terra Indígena Krikati, Maranhão
Pykobjê, 600 speakers in Terra Indígena Governador close to Amarante, Maranhão
Parkatêjê, 12 speakers in Terra Indígena Mãe Maria, Bom Jesus do Tocantins, Pará
Kỳikatêjê, 9 speakers in Terra Indígena Mãe Maria, Bom Jesus do Tocantins, Pará
Krẽje, under 30 speakers in Maranhão and Pará

Loukotka (1968)
Loukotka (1968) divides the Timbira tribes into two groups, Timbirá (Canela) and Krao. The majority are included under Timbira:

Timbira (Canela)
Mehin, Tajé (Timbirá)
Kreapimkatajé (Krepúnkateye)
Krenjé (Krẽyé)
Remkokamekran (Remako-Kamékrere, Merrime)
Aponegicran (Apáñekra)
Krenkatajé (Canella, Kenkateye)
Sakamekran (Chacamecran, Mateiros)
Purekamekran, Makamekran (Pepuxi)
Apinagé, Karaho (Carauau)
Menren (Gaviões, Augutjé – only a few words known)
Meitajé

Krao
Krahó, Krikati (Kỳikatêjê)
Piokobjé (Bucobu, Pukobje, Paicogê)
Kapiekran

Ramirez et al. (2015)
Ramirez et al. (2015) considers Timbira-Kayapó to be a dialect continuum, as follows:
Canela-Krahô ↔ Gavião-Krĩkati ↔ Apinajé ↔ Kayapó ↔ Suyá-Tapayuna ↔ Panará-Kayapó do Sul

Apart from Kapiekran, all Krao varieties are recognized by the ISO.  Under the Timbira group, Loukotka included several purported languages for which nothing is recorded:  Kukoekamekran, Karákatajé, Kenpokatajé, Kanakatayé, Norokwajé (Ñurukwayé).  The Poncatagê (Põkateye) are likewise unidentifiable.

Another common convention for division, though geographic rather than linguistic, is Western Timbira (Apinayé alone) vs Eastern Timbira (Canela, Krikatí, Krahô, Gavião, and others).

Gurupy is a river, sometimes used to refer to the Krenye.

Nikulin (2020)

References

Jê languages
Languages of Brazil